Ladywood House is a residential apartment skyscraper in Portsmouth, England. When completed in 1971, it was the tallest building in the city, until 2005 when it was surpassed by Spinnaker Tower.

References

External links

Residential buildings completed in 1971
Residential skyscrapers in England
Buildings and structures in Portsmouth
1971 establishments in England
Modernist architecture in England